Cantwell v. Connecticut, 310 U.S. 296 (1940), is a landmark court decision by the United States Supreme Court holding that the First Amendment's federal protection of religious free exercise incorporates via the Due Process Clause of the Fourteenth Amendment and so applies to state governments too.

Background
The statute was an early type of consumer protection law: it required the Secretary, before issuing a certificate permitting solicitation, to determine whether the cause was "a religious one or is a bona fide object of charity or philanthropy" and whether the solicitation "conforms to reasonable standards of efficiency and integrity."

Upon determination of the cause's legitimacy, a solicitation certificate would be issued.

Newton Cantwell (a Jehovah's Witness) and his two sons, were preaching in a heavily Roman Catholic neighborhood in New Haven, Connecticut. The Cantwells were going door to door, with books and pamphlets and a portable phonograph with sets of records. Each record contained a description of one of the books.  One such book was "Enemies", which was an attack on organized religion in general and especially the Roman Catholic Church. Jesse Cantwell stopped two men on the street and requested permission to play a phonograph. They gave permission, and after hearing the recording, the two citizens were incensed; though they wanted to physically assault the Cantwells, they restrained themselves.

Cantwell and his two sons were arrested and charged with: (1) violation of a Connecticut statute requiring solicitors to obtain a certificate from the secretary of the public welfare council ("Secretary") before soliciting funds from the public, and (2) inciting a common-law breach of the peace.

Prior history
The Connecticut Supreme Court disagreed with the Cantwells, finding that the statute was an effort by the state of Connecticut to protect the public against fraud, and as such, the statute was constitutional.  The Connecticut Supreme Court upheld the conviction of all three on the statutory charge and affirmed one son's conviction of inciting a breach of the peace, but remanded the inciting a breach of peace charge against the other two for a new trial.

Issue
The issue presented before the court was whether the state's action in convicting the Cantwells of inciting a breach of the peace and violating the solicitation statute violated their First Amendment right to free exercise of religion.

Opinion of the Court

The Court found that Cantwell's action was protected by the First and Fourteenth Amendments.

Justice Owen Roberts wrote in a unanimous opinion that "to condition the solicitation of aid for the perpetuation of religious views or systems upon a license, the grant of which rests in the exercise of a determination by state authority as to what is a religious cause, is to lay a forbidden burden upon the exercise of liberty protected by the Constitution."

In general the court held with respect to the Establishment Clause and Free Exercise Clause and their embodiment in the Due Process Clause of the Fourteenth Amendment:

We hold that the statute, as construed and applied to the appellants, deprives them of their liberty without due process of law in contravention of the Fourteenth Amendment. The fundamental concept of liberty embodied in that Amendment embraces the liberties guaranteed by the First Amendment. The First Amendment declares that Congress shall make no law respecting an establishment of religion or prohibiting the free exercise thereof. The Fourteenth Amendment has rendered the legislatures of the states as incompetent as Congress to enact such laws. The constitutional inhibition of legislation on the subject of religion has a double aspect. On the one hand, it forestalls compulsion by law of the acceptance of any creed or the practice of any form of worship. Freedom of conscience and freedom to adhere to such religious organization or form of worship as the individual may choose cannot be restricted by law. On the other hand, it safeguards the free exercise of the chosen form of religion. Thus the Amendment embraces two concepts,—freedom to believe and freedom to act. The first is absolute but, in the nature of things, the second cannot be. Conduct remains subject to regulation for the protection of society.  The freedom to act must have appropriate definition to preserve the enforcement of that protection. In every case the power to regulate must be so exercised as not, in attaining a permissible end, unduly to infringe the protected freedom. No one would contest the proposition that a state may not, by statute, wholly deny the right to preach or to disseminate religious views. Plainly such a previous and absolute restraint would violate the terms of the guarantee. It is equally clear that a state may by general and non-discriminatory legislation regulate the times, the places, and the manner of soliciting upon its streets, and of holding meetings thereon; and may in other respects safeguard the peace, good order and comfort of the community, without unconstitutionally invading the liberties protected by the Fourteenth Amendment.

Significance
Before the Cantwell decision, it was not legally clear that the First Amendment protected religious practitioners against restrictions at the state and local levels as well as federal. But the Supreme Court in Cantwell said it did, thereby ushering in an era of greatly strengthened religious freedom.

This case incorporated the First Amendment's Free Exercise Clause, thereby applying it to the states and protecting free exercise of religion from intrusive state action. The Establishment Clause was incorporated seven years later in Everson v. Board of Education.

See also
 Incorporation (Bill of Rights)
 R.A.V. v. City of St. Paul,

References

Further reading

External links
 
 
 "Religion: Freedom of Faith", Time magazine, April 8, 1940, contemporaneous article on the case, Online

United States Supreme Court cases
United States Supreme Court cases of the Hughes Court
United States Free Speech Clause case law
United States free exercise of religion case law
Incorporation case law
1940 in United States case law
Jehovah's Witnesses litigation in the United States
American Civil Liberties Union litigation
1940 in Connecticut
Legal history of Connecticut
History of New Haven, Connecticut
Christianity and law in the 20th century